Weststar Aviation Services Sdn Bhd (doing business as Weststar Aviation Services) is a non-scheduled airline company based in Sultan Abdul Aziz Shah Airport. It is a subsidiary of Weststar Group.

History 
It was established in April 2003 upon the approval of the Air Operation Certificate (AOC) by the Malaysian Department of Civil Aviation (DCA). Its primary fleet consists of Eurocopter EC 120 Colibri, EC 135 Ecureuil, AS365 Dauphin and AgustaWestland AW139. In 2018 they acquired 3 AgustaWestland AW189 that transports mostly Petronas and Shell personals in Miri, Sarawak. Weststar offered Petronas to operate the AW189’s at a cost similar to operating an AW139 and is currently the cheapest operator of AW189’s in the region.

Fleet

The Weststar Aviation Services fleet consists of the following aircraft (as of November 2016):

Eurocopter EC120 Colibri
Eurocopter EC135
Eurocopter AS365 Dauphin
AgustaWestland AW139
AgustaWestland AW189
Boeing 767-200

References

External links
Weststar Aviation Services

2003 establishments in Malaysia
Airlines of Malaysia
Privately held companies of Malaysia